Paul-James Corrigan is a Scottish stage and screen actor. He is best known for his roles as Adam in Gary Tank Commander and as Stevie Burns in River City. He is known for his work with s1jobs, after fronting a TV campaign beginning in 2014 'Davie Knows'. The ad drew over 1.6 million views on YouTube.

In 2015, he appeared on stage opposite River City co-star Frank Gallagher in Butterfly at the Oran Mor in Glasgow.

Paul is currently in a relationship with girlfriend Sarah, a secondary school teacher. In 2020, his half- brother Jordan tragically killed himself through drug overdose.

Filmography

Film

Television

Theatre 
The Wolves in the Walls (National Theatre of Scotland/ Improbable)
Carthage Must Be Destroyed (Traverse Theatre, Edinburgh)
Risk (Macrobert, Stirling)
Free Fall (7:84 Theatre Company)
Gobbo (National Theatre of Scotland Ensemble)
Mancub (National Theatre of Scotland Ensemble/ Vanishing Point)
James and the Giant Peach (Citizens Theatre, Glasgow)
No Mean City (Citizens Theatre, Glasgow)
The Borrowers (Citizens Theatre, Glasgow)
Aladdin (King's Theatre, Glasgow)

References

External links

Living people
Scottish male film actors
Scottish male stage actors
Scottish male television actors
Scottish male soap opera actors
Male actors from Glasgow
Year of birth missing (living people)